Ribble Motor Services was a large regional bus operator in the North West England based in Preston.

History

Ribble Motor Services commenced operating in 1919, and grew to be the largest operator in the region, with a territory stretching from Carlisle in Cumberland to southern Lancashire.

In 1961, the Scout Motor Services business was purchased, and absorbed into Ribble in 1968.  The W.C.Standerwick coaching business had been purchased in 1932 but was kept as a separate subsidiary of Ribble.

Ribble operated Cherry Red and Ivory liveried vehicles throughout its BET Group ownership, changing to Poppy Red for buses and white for coaches in 1972, 3 years after it had passed into the ownership of the nationalised operator National Bus Company when corporate liveries were introduced. The first batch of Leyland Nationals were delivered from the  factory finished in dark red paint but were repainted into Poppy Red by the company before they entered service.

Prior to the deregulation of bus services in 1986, Ribble's territory was reduced with the company's north Cumbrian operations passing to Cumberland Motor Services, and the Merseyside operations to a recreated North Western. As part of the privatisation of the National Bus Company, Ribble was sold on 2 March 1988 in a management buyout. In May 1989, Ribble was purchased by Stagecoach Holdings. In May 1989, Barrow Borough Transport was purchased.

In April 2001, Stagecoach sold the Ribble operations in Blackburn, Hyndburn, Clitheroe and Bolton to the Blazefield Group, which rebranded them as Lancashire United and Burnley & Pendle.

As a subsidiary of Stagecoach, the company remained registered as Ribble Motor Services. Its services were operated under the trading name Ribble Buses, then as Stagecoach Ribble, Stagecoach in Lancashire (which became part of Stagecoach North West) and finally as part of Stagecoach Merseyside & South Lancashire. Its bus routes were transferred to Glenvale Transport Ltd (formerly Stagecoach Merseyside) in 2013. In 2021 Stagecoach Merseyside & South Lancashire changed their trading name from Glenvale Transport Limited to Ribble Motor Services Limited to reflect heritage of the Ribble brand.

Vehicles
The company mainly operated Leyland vehicles, built nearby in Leyland, Lancashire. However, there were some exceptions. In 1948/9 Sentinel had developed an underfloor-engined single deck bus, which increased the seating capacity significantly. Ribble took two batches of these buses. In the 1960s Ribble ordered ten lightweight Bedford coaches for their extended tour fleet.

A batch of Bristol single deck vehicles was ordered before the government brought together Leyland Bus and National Bus Company into the plan to build the Leyland National bus factory in Cumberland. After the first batch of 10 fitted with Leyland engines showed poor fuel economy, a larger batch of 30 was delivered with Gardner engines, which had better fuel efficiency. Some Bristol VR double-deckers were also acquired.

Ribble engineers were responsible for specifying and maintaining coaches for Standerwick and North Western (the coach fleet in Manchester left over when the original North Western Road Car Company was split between the SELNEC PTE, Crosville Motor Services and Trent Motor Traction) even after they were transferred and became National Travel (North West).

Two batches of the lowheight Albion Lowlander double deck service bus were purchased by Ribble, all the LR1 model. 1851 to 1860, and a year later 1861 to 1866. They had a fully fronted cab, and were a replica of the highbridge PD3's that Ribble operated; they were not popular machines. Ribble acquired a 17th example, when they took over Bamber Bridge Motor Services, 747EUS the ex demonstrator; this was Ribble's only half cab example.

Double deck coaches
Ribble were leaders with regard to the introduction of double-deck coaches, after the Second World War when demand was very heavy for express services - the single deck coach with the engine at the front would seat 35 passengers. In the early 1950s Leyland introduced the Royal Tiger underfloor coach, which increased the number of passengers to 41.

However, Ribble went one step further and introduced the 'White Lady' double-deck coach. Painted in coach livery, these lowbridge buses had 49 seats (Ian Allan abc Ribble 2nd. Edition 1952); and were used on Blackpool and Morecambe services. There were two batches of 'White Lady'  1201 - 1230 with Burlingham 5 bay window arrangement downstairs bodywork; and 1231 - 1250 with East Lancs bodywork with a very attractive four bay window arrangement.

The initial batch were downgraded to red liveried service buses in the mid 1950s, and were mostly to be found round Dalton-in-Furness and Ulverston depots. The East Lancs double deck coaches operated as such into the 1960s.

Throughout the 1950s the "White Ladies" ran on all the major express and limited stop services out of Lower Mosley Street, Manchester. In particular they served the routes due north including X3 & X13 to Great Harwood, X23 Clitheroe, X43 Skipton and Colne, X53 Burnley, and X66 Blackburn. They also ran on the X27 service from Liverpool to Skipton via Southport.  The upper deck configuration of a sunken side aisle with four seats all together on one side was an unusual combination. (source - personal first hand experience and Ian Allan Ribble Buses & Coaches 3rd & 4th editions, 1953 & 1956).On Saturdays, the service from Lower Mosely Street to Morecambe in the 1950s was serviced by two White Lady coaches in tandem, a PD2 (1231 to 50) at the front and a PD1/3 (1201 to 30) at the rear. The PD2 was in cream livery and the PD1/3 in maroon. (source- personal experience. The route was via Manchester New Road, Manchester, and I and my brother, living on that road, turned out to see them every Saturday). Occasionally, this service in the return direction was operated by a Standerwick Burlingham Seagull coach. The Burnley and Morecambe services from Manchester were numbered X4 and X14.

Motorways were developed in the late 1950s – in 1958 the M6 Preston Bypass was the first motorway in the UK. Arrangements were in hand for a totally new double deck coach, based on the Leyland Atlantean, 50 reclining seats, toilet and plenty of room for luggage. Christened 'Gay Hostess', these coaches were a common sight on the M6 and the M1 in the 1960s. One was at the opening of the M1, and Ribble milked the publicity for all it was worth.

The 'Gay Hostess' operated into London's Victoria Coach Station, and stood out from all the other operators' vehicles - their application of the cream and maroon red was carefully applied, to give a coach of distinction. When introduced in the 1960s, these vehicles were icons of the bus industry; yet during the winter months the majority were laid up for six months delicensed (Ribble Allocation Lists 1960's).

Ribble had fifteen, but their sister operation Standerwick had 22. All were transferred to Standerwick/Scout to operate on Motorway express services. Only one 'Gay Hostess' is in preservation, SFV 421, and restoration work has now commenced after a long period of storage.  The vehicle pioneered so much for Ribble/Standerwick and coaching in general  One of the 'Gay Hostess' class, NRN 607, featured prominently in the 1972 feature film Mutiny on the Buses in its post-Ribble Group life, before being exported to Hong Kong. 

On the Ribble homeground, in 1962, another generation of 'White Lady' was about to emerge, this was the 59 coach seat body on a Leyland Atlantean chassis; twenty of these were built. As the journeys would be shorter, no toilet facility was carried. These 'White Ladies' survived into National Bus ownership, but eventually they were downgraded to service buses by the application of bus livery, although they retained all their coach features and continued to be used on medium-distance express services. 

Another double deck coach was developed around 1968 for motorway running by Standerwick within Ribble ownership.  This time a 60-seater built on a Bristol VRL/LH chassis driven by a Leyland Power Plus 680 engine mounted vertically and longitudinally behind the off-side rear axle. In total 30 were delivered starting with vehicle 50, which was used for trials; and followed by three batches, given fleet numbers 51 to 61, 62 to 71 and finally 72 to 79.

Services
Ribble operated the service X60 and X70 between Manchester, Bolton, Chorley, Preston  and Blackpool and this service was known as the world's most frequent express service in the 1960s. A scheduled departure every fifteen minutes in the summer - with duplicates. Ribble, North Western, and Lancashire United were the most regular performers on this joint service.

The L3/L30 Liverpool, Bootle, Waterloo  to Crosby stage carriage service was the most frequent in its class. Operating for nineteen hours a day, in the 1950s and 1960s a five-minute interval peak hour service with a duplicate or two thrown in as well. Bootle depot operated the service, generally using the highest capacity double deckers on the route.

Bootle depot never received any allocation of the first generation of Leyland Atlanteans, this nearly all double-deck stage carriage service depot stayed loyal to the Leyland Titan PD2 and the PD3. In early 1970s a downgraded 'White Lady' Atlantean was allocated to the depot. On Merseyside Aintree Depot had two Atlanteans allocated for the 101 service to Preston from Liverpool (1629/1630). In 1974 Bootle received a large batch of the Park Royal bodied Atlanteans, and from then on the Leyland Titan PD3s were in decline.

The least used Liverpool local service was the L11, introduced during the Second World War, the bus operated three times daily (twice on Sundays) from Crosby Bus Station through Little Crosby to Fort Crosby. Fort Crosby being a prison camp for the duration of the War. Little Crosby never had a bus service up till then.

After the war, the L11 was cut back to the section from Crosby Bus Station to Little Crosby (Dibb Lane), operating three times daily, and twice on Sundays. The service was mainly used by schoolchildren attending secondary school in Crosby. The L11 was the only service to leave Crosby Bus Station that turned left into Little Crosby Road. Ribble threatened to withdraw the service on several occasions, but the L11 survived into the 1970s.

An unusual arrangement was made at Maghull, service 411 Liverpool, Crosby, Maghull, Ormskirk would meet an Ormskirk to Liverpool (311) at Hall Lane, Maghull. To ensure the two buses linked, the conductors had to obtain the signature of their counterpart from the other bus. Prior to the introduction of the 411 service, service 303 operated from Crosby, via  Aintree to Liverpool; and the link was to ensure through passengers from Crosby to Aintree had their connection.

Liverpool Corporation operated several joint services with Ribble in the Bootle area of the city.  Service 28 Old Haymarket to Netherton was a joint operation; but operated solely by the Corporation buses  (Ribble and MPTE timetables).

Considered to be one of the most scenic termini in the British Isles is the Ribble service 667 Ambleside - Dungeon Ghyll; the service became 516 in the shake ups of the late 1960s and early 1970s; and the service passed to Stagecoach Cumberland in the 1990s. Dungeon Ghyll is at the head of the Langdale Valley, and is popular with hikers, and climbers. Towards the end of the route there was a short section of road where buses could become grounded, Ribble would send a delegation in the latest single deck vehicle down the valley, to test if the vehicle was suitable for the route.

In Southport Ribble services were not allowed to run the length of Lord Street, this was the prime area for the Southport Corporation buses. On leaving the Ribble Bus Station, several services operated the full length of the Promenade; whilst the S services and the Wigan services headed up Duke Street. This all changed when Southport became part of the Merseyside Metropolitan area, and Merseyside Passenger Transport Executive (MPTE)then operated the former Corporation services.

In the 1980s when the current Bus Station in Ormskirk replaced the Ribble one, the first bus to arrive at the interchange, scraped the ground.  The engineers discovered that there was insufficient clearance for certain types of buses.

Depots
Ribble's Head Office was in Frenchwood Avenue, Preston.

However, their depots varied in size from  Preston, Selborne Street, and Bootle Depots, which both accommodated close on one hundred vehicles; to small depots like Dalton-in-Furness with a handful. There were out-stations too, such as those at Appleby, Bowness-on-Solway and Sedbergh, the out-station never having a particular vehicle allocated permanently.

One depot was a former railway terminus, and that was the Cheshire Lines' railway station on Lord Street, Southport; Ribble turned the former railway building into a bus station and depot.

Ambleside depot was built of local Lakeland stone, and was situated below the bus station; the depot entrance being in the next street.  The final new depot before bus deregulation,  was situated in Skelmersdale (New Town), and replaced Ormskirk Depot. Services in the New Town area had expanded, and the Ormskirk site was inadequate for the task.

The original Bootle Depot, in Hawthorne Road, was fully covered. In the late 1970s a new open plan depot was brought into use 250 yards away from the original garage. The maintenance building on the far side of the site, features the pits and all the equipment in a modern environment for servicing buses. It is still in use today by Arriva.

Garstang Depot had a regular vehicle allocation until the late 1950s, when it became an out-station. Buses would work out to Garstang for an overnight garaging, then the following day return to their home depots.

Carlisle There was a depot in Lowther Street/Scotch Street, and until January 1969 Ribble operated all the urban services around the city except for Botcherby, which was operated by United Automobile Company.

There was also a Depot of medium size at Burnley, Centenary Way- now demolished (Source: Bus UK Forums) which was the terminus of the X4 express PD2 White Lady service from Lower Moseley Street, Manchester (Source: personal travel to this location on X4 from Manchester Moseley Street). This also housed one of the then newly built Gay Hostesses.(Source: ibid). A depot also existed in Trumpet Street, Manchester behind Lower Moseley Street bus station. ( Source: Bus UK Forums)

References

External links

Ribble Enthusiasts' Club
Ribble Vehicle Preservation Trust
Don Roberts' Ribble Buses website
Ribble Buses tribute website
Made in Preston: Ribble Motors

Former bus operators in Lancashire
1919 establishments in England
1989 disestablishments in England
Companies based in Preston
British companies established in 1919
Transport companies established in 1919